B.E.S. Publishing is an American publishing company, founded in 1939 as Barron's Educational Services, a publisher of materials to help students to prepare for college entrance examinations. In recent years, Barron's expanded into many other publishing fields, with 2,000 titles in a wide range of categories. In 2018, Barron's sold its brand name and its test prep list to Kaplan Test Prep; the company was renamed B.E.S. Publishing. The company was acquired by Peterson's Publishing in 2019.

B.E.S. Publishing's headquarters were in Hauppauge, New York. Several present and past series include:

Step-by-Step cookbooks, including both ethnic and appliance-based titles
Made Easy educational books, which cover numerous school subjects, particularly on high school and college level, in concise form
1001 Pitfalls, foreign-language grammars focusing on common student pitfalls. The 501 Verbs series functions as companion volumes, and abbreviated pocket-sized grammars, verb tables, and vocabulary books based on these are also available
Master the Basics, foreign-language self-instruction
E-Z Series, a series of self-teaching textbooks designed to help students master a variety of subjects.
Painless, a reference-oriented review of numerous academic subjects
MazeToons Series, cartoon illustrated books of mazes by Joe Wos. Titles include "A-Maze-Ing Animals", "Myths and Monsters", "Maze-O-Zoic", “A-Maze-Ing America", and “Mega Maze Challenge.”

See also
The Night at the Museum, published by Barron's
''The Food Lover's Companion

References

External links

Educational publishing companies of the United States
Test preparation companies
Publishing companies established in 1939
Study guides